Minettia is a genus of small flies of the family Lauxaniidae. They have almost worldwide distribution, is one of the most species rich genera of the family with more than 120 described species.  The Palaearctic is the most diverse with some 56 described species. The genus is divided into 3 subgenera.

Species
Subgenus Plesioninettia Shatalkin, 2000
M. crassulata Shatalkin, 1998
M. divaricata Sasakawa, 1985
M. filia (Becker, 1895)
M. fuscescens Shatalkin, 1998
M. gemina Shatalkin, 1992
M. gemmata Shatalkin, 1992
M. helva Czerny, 1932
M. helvola (Becker, 1895)
M. ishidai (Sasakawa, 1985)
M. loewi (Schiner, 1864)
M. omei Shatalkin, 1998
M. punctata Sasakawa, 1985
M. styriaca (Strobl, 1892)
M. tenebrica Shatalkin, 1992
Subgenus Frendelia Collin, 1948
M. acuminata Sasakawa, 1985
M. austriaca Hennig, 1951
M. eoa Shatalkin, 1992
M. kunashirica Shatalkin, 1992
M. longipennis (Fabricius, 1794)
M. martineki Ceianu, 1991
M. nigritarsis Shatalkin, 1998
Subgenus Minettia Robineau-Desvoidy, 1830
M. andalusiaca (Strobl, 1899)
M. biseriata (Loew, 1847)
M. bulgarica Papp, 1981
M. cantolraensis Carles-Tolra, 1998
M. caucasica Shatalkin, 1998
M. cypriota Papp, 1981
M. czernyi Freidberg & Yarom, 1990
M. dedecor (Loew, 1873)
M. desmometopa (de Meijere, 1907)
M. fasciata (Fallén, 1820)
M. filippovi Shatalkin, 1998
M. flavipalpis (Loew, 1847)
M. flaviventris (Costa, 1844)
M. galil Freidberg, 1991
M. hyrcanica Shatalkin, 1999
M. inusta (Meigen, 1826)
M. linguifera Sasakawa & Kozanek, 1995
M. longiseta (Loew, 1847)
M. lupulina (Fabricius, 1787)
M. muricata (Becker, 1895)
M. palaestinensis Papp, 1981
M. pallida (Meigen, 1830)
M. plumicheta (Rondani, 1868)
M. plumicornis (Fallén, 1820)
M. punctiventris (Rondani, 1868)
M. quadrisetosa (Becker, 1907)
M. rivosa (Meigen, 1826)
M. subtinctiventris Papp, 1981
M. subvittata (Loew, 1847)
M. suillorum (Robineau-Desvoidy, 1830)
M. tabidiventris (Papp, 1877)
M. tetrachaeta (Loew, 1873)
M. tinctiventris (Rondani, 1868)
M. tubifer (Meigen, 1826)
M. tunisica Papp, 1981
Unplaced
M. nigriventris (Czerny, 1932)

See also
 List of Minettia species

References

Lauxaniidae
Articles containing video clips
Lauxanioidea genera
Taxa named by Jean-Baptiste Robineau-Desvoidy